Expert Opinion on Drug Delivery is a monthly peer-reviewed medical journal publishing review articles covering all aspects of research on drug delivery, from initial concept to potential therapeutic application and final relevance in clinical use. It was established in 2004 and is published by Taylor and Francis Group. The editor-in-chief is Uday Kompella (University of Colorado).

Abstracting and indexing 
The journal is abstracted and indexed in Chemical Abstracts, EMBASE/Excerpta Medica, MEDLINE/Index Medicus, and the Science Citation Index Expanded. According to the Journal Citation Reports, the journal has a 2021 impact factor of 8.129.

References

External links 

Pharmacology journals
Publications established in 2004
Monthly journals
English-language journals
Expert Opinion journals
Taylor & Francis academic journals